Muhammad Ali Jinnah was a 20th-century politician and statesman who is known as the founding father of Pakistan.

Jinnah may also refer to:
 Jinnah (film), a 1998 film about Muhammad Ali Jinnah
 Jinnah: India, Partition, Independence, a 2009 book by Jaswant Singh
 Jinnah Bridge, a bridge in Karachi, Pakistan
 Jinnah family, a political family of Pakistan
 Jinnah of Pakistan, a 1984 book by Stanley Wolpert

See also 
 
 List of things named after Muhammad Ali Jinnah
 Jannah
 Jina (disambiguation)
 Jinnah Hospital (disambiguation)